Artanish is a village in the Shoghakat Municipality of the Gegharkunik Province of Armenia. The village was populated by Azerbaijanis before the exodus of Azerbaijanis from Armenia after the outbreak of the Nagorno-Karabakh conflict. In 1988-1989 Armenian refugees from Azerbaijan settled in the village. On a hill just to the west are the ruins of cyclopean fortresses, and nearby is a church and a cemetery.

Nature 
The vicinity of the village hosts 111 species of butterflies and is recognized as the Prime Butterfly Area "Artanish-Shorzha". The area is also known as one of the key birdwatching sites of Armenia.

Gallery

References

External links 

 
 

Populated places in Gegharkunik Province